Caecum bipartitum is a species of minute sea snail, a marine gastropod mollusk or micromollusk in the family Caecidae.

Distribution

Description 
The maximum recorded shell length is 2.5 mm.

Habitat 
Minimum recorded depth is 1.5 m. Maximum recorded depth is 66 m.

References

Caecidae
Gastropods described in 1870